Quron Xavier Pratt (born April 25, 1991) is an American football wide receiver who is currently a free agent. He was an undrafted free agent by the Eagles in 2014. He played college football at Rutgers.

College career
Pratt was named the Rutgers' team MVP in 2013, and appeared in all 13 games (9 starts) as a senior. He tallied 516 yards on 32 catches also adding a blocked punt and a 99-yard kickoff return for a touchdown against Eastern Michigan. He was a 3x conference all-academic honoree and also was a semifinalist for the National Football Foundation Campbell Trophy. In his collegiate career, he appeared in 48 games (15 starts) while recording 87 catches for 1,087 yards and one touchdown.

Professional career
Quron was signed by the Eagles on May 13, 2014 as an undrafted free agent. On Sep 4, 2015, Pratt was cut in the last round of preseason cuts. He was added to the practice squad on September 6, 2015. Pratt was released from the Eagles practice squad on September 22, 2015 and signed quarterback Stephen Morris who was released from the Eagles roster so they could sign 27-year-old veteran Thad Lewis.

Personal life
He is the son of Merrill and Robin Pratt. Has a twin sister, Javon, and an older sister, Lailah. While at Rutgers he doubled majored in labor studies and sociology.

References

External links
NFL Draft Scout bio

1991 births
Living people
American football wide receivers
Rutgers Scarlet Knights football players
Philadelphia Eagles players
People from Palmyra, New Jersey